Francis "Ed" Edward Buttrey (born December 14, 1965) is a Republican member of the Montana Legislature. He served in the Montana Senate from 2011 to 2019 and then served in the Montana House of Representatives. He was elected to Senate District 13, representing Great Falls, Montana, in 2011.

Legislative history

Buttrey served as Majority Whip in the Senate during the 2015-2016 session.

Buttrey has garnered a mixed reputation in regards to policy during his tenure in both Montana legislative bodies. Though Buttrey was lauded by centrist Republicans and Democrats alike for working on Medicaid expansion in Montana, he was criticized by the Center for Budget and Policy Priorities for his legislation which the Center said "would likely cause coverage losses similar to or even higher than those of Arkansas, the first state with a Medicaid work requirement. That state ended coverage for more than 18,000 people.”

In 2013, Buttrey voted for SB 405 which repealed same-day voter registration. Then-AARP President Jeannine English described the bill and other measures like it as "...a form of voter suppression."

In 2019, Buttrey voted against Montana HB 547 which prohibits employers from stopping employees from discussing wages.

Campaign for U.S House
On December 18, 2016, Buttrey announced his candidacy for the special election to fill Montana's at-large U.S. House seat vacated by United States Secretary of the Interior appointee Ryan Zinke.

At the Republican party convention on March 3, 2017, Buttrey and multiple other GOP candidates were eliminated in favor of businessman Greg Gianforte who would go on to win the general election as well.

Personal life
Buttrey received a degree in electrical engineering from Montana State University. He is a volunteer firefighter and volunteer football coach.

References

Republican Party members of the Montana House of Representatives
Republican Party Montana state senators
Montana State University alumni
1965 births
Living people
Politicians from Great Falls, Montana
Politicians from Helena, Montana
21st-century American politicians